Ambassadors' Alley is a linden tree alley located at the popular pedestrian stretch Bentbaša-Dariva along the river Miljacka in Sarajevo, Bosnia and Herzegovina. It is a project in which ambassadors, serving in Bosnia and Herzegovina as high officials of their representative countries or major international organizations, get an opportunity to plant a linden tree during their mission and in front of every planted linden tree, a stone plate is installed containing the ambassador's name, country or international organization that represents.

As of May 2022, the full number of planted trees and placed stone plates is 226.

History
Ambassadors' Alley was established in 2002 and the first linden tree was planted by the former High Representative Wolfgang Petritsch, and the second one by Jacques Paul Klein, the former Head of the United Nations Mission in Bosnia and Herzegovina.

It is a tradition that after planting, project participants are presented with certificates that will forever remind them of this act.

Reconstruction
Since the plaques with the names of the ambassadors are a constant target of vandals, in 2018 the reconstruction of public lighting was done, as well as the installation of lighting under the boards with the names of the ambassadors.

References

External links

Full list of ambassadors

Streets in Sarajevo
Stari Grad, Sarajevo